Walman (or Valman) is a Torricelli language of Papua New Guinea.  Matthew S. Dryer and Lea Brown of the University at Buffalo are currently writing a grammar of Walman.  They have also published a paper showing that the word for 'and' in Walman that connects two nouns (as in "John and Mary") is actually a verb, with the first conjunct as subject and the second conjunct as object.

References

External links
 Valman Swadesh List

Wapei languages
Languages of Sandaun Province